Gaston II of Foix-Béarn (1308 – September 1343), son of Gaston I of Foix-Béarn and Jeanne of Artois, was the 10th Count of Foix.

In 1315, after the death of his father Gaston I, he became Count of Foix, and Viscount of Béarn, Marsan, Gabardan, Nébouzan and Lautrec under the regency of his mother, Jeanne of Artois. Count Gaston II imprisoned his mother Jeanne d'Artois in 1331 at the Château of Foix, being later moved in turn to Orthez, Lourdes and Carbonne.

Gaston II married his cousin Eleanore de Comminges, daughter of Bernard VII of Comminges and Laura de Montfort. Eleanore de Comminges brought, as a dowry, her rights to the County of Bigorre.

They had one son: Gaston III Febus, who succeeded his father as Count of Foix.

Gaston II had several illegitimate children:

 Pedro de Bearn, married Florensa de Aragón, Lady of Biscay.
 Bearnesa, wife of Arnaldo Ramon de Castellnou, viscount of Orthez.
 Margarita, wife of Juan de Castellverdu, seigneur of Caumont
 Arnaldo Guillermo de Bearn (died 1391), married to Juana, Lady of Morlaàs.

His actions in 1339 during the conquest of the castle of Tartas resulted in him receiving the title of Viscount of Lautrec.

He was at the Siege of Algeciras (1342–44) in southern Spain, which was led by King Alfonso XI of Castile. He died at Seville in 1343.

Notes

Further reading
https://web.archive.org/web/20130510001306/http://www.foixstory.com/data/comtes/09.htm . (In French)

14th-century Princes of Andorra
Counts of Foix
1308 births
1343 deaths
Occitan nobility
House of Foix
Viscounts of Béarn